Alfred Money-Wigram (sometimes Alfred Wigram, 21 July 1856 – 13 October 1899) was a British brewery company director, and Member of Parliament for the Romford division of Essex from 1894 to 1897.

Money-Wigram was born on 21 July 1856.Look and Learn describe him as a "wealthy banker"; the International Brewers' Journal records an Alfred Money-Wigram as a shareholder in Reid's Brewery Company, and he is listed as a director of Reid's Brewery Company Limited in a successful 1894 taxation case before the High Court of Justice.

Alfred Money-Wigram was elected Conservative MP for Romford in an 1894 by-election on 2 April 1894 arising from the death of the incumbent Conservative MP, James Theobald. He retained the seat in the 1895 United Kingdom general election held from 13 July to 7 August 1895, but resigned his seat on 16 January 1897.

He died on 13 October 1899.

References

External links
 

1866 births
1899 deaths
Conservative Party (UK) MPs for English constituencies
UK MPs 1892–1895
UK MPs 1895–1900
Masters of the Worshipful Company of Brewers
19th-century English businesspeople